North Street may refer to:

Settlements
 North Street, Berkshire, England, United Kingdom
 North Street, Bristol, England, United Kingdom
 North Street, Hampshire, England, United Kingdom
 North Street, Kent, England, United Kingdom
 North Street, Michigan, United States

Roads
 North Street (Boston, Massachusetts), an American red-light district
 North Street, Glasgow, a road in Scotland
 North Street (York), a road in England
 North Street, Dorking, a road in England
 North Street, Romford, a road in England

Structures
 North Street (SEPTA Route 102 station), a SEPTA Media–Sharon Hill Line station in Collingdale, Pennsylvania
 North Street (stadium), a football stadium in Alfreton, Derbyshire

Organisations
 North Street Capital, LP is a privately owned private equity and hedge fund firm based in Greenwich, Connecticut.

See also
Basil Street in London, originally known as North Street
North Street Historic District (disambiguation)